was a Japanese manga artist. A dropout of Nagoya University, his best-known work is the  manga series.

Biography
Ogino's first manga was Peacock King. It was serialized in Weekly Young Jump from 1986 to 1989, and was published in 17 tankōbon volumes. It follows the adventures of a Buddhist monk who is a member of a secret organization that specializes in demon hunting. The stories involve all sorts of religion and mythology folklore. It was adapted into an OVA series Spirit Warrior and live-action film in 1988.

Ogino worked on a third Peacock King series, which was serialized in Young Jump from 2006 to 2010 for a total of 12 volumes. This continues Kujaku's adventures from Taimaseiden. It focuses on ancient Japan's gods and mythos as it branches from in the middle of the Taimaseiden story line. His fourth series  ran in Monthly Big Comic Spirits since 2012 and has been published by Shogakukan in 6 volumes. Along with Rising, he published  starting in 2012 for the magazine Comic Ran Twins.

Ogino was an honorary professor of the Shanghai Institute of Visual Art of Fudan University and Master of The Beijing DeTao Masters Academy.

Ogino died at 59 on April 29, 2019, due to renal failure.

Works

References

External links
  
 

1959 births
2019 deaths
Manga artists from Gifu Prefecture
Nagoya University alumni